Darovskoy (masculine), Darovskaya (feminine), or Darovskoye (neuter) may refer to:
Darovskoy District, a district of Kirov Oblast, Russia
Darovskoy (urban-type settlement), an urban-type settlement in Darovskoy District of Kirov Oblast, Russia